Knackwurst (in North America sometimes spelled knockwurst refers to a type of sausage of northern German origin from the mid-16th century. The many available varieties depend on the geographical region of their production.

Etymology and pronunciation
The German noun Knackwurst—which, in English, is sometimes corrupted as knockwurst—comes from the German verb knacken ("to crack") or the adjective knackig ("crisp"). This refers to the swelling of the sausage during the process of cooking, so that the skin becomes pressurized and balloon-like, and tends to "pop", often exploding the juices, when bitten into. (Cf. the British term "banger".) The term ″Knackwurst″ came up in Germany the middle of the 16th century. In Germany, all different kinds of Knackwürste are abbreviated Knacker.

Knockwurst in the US

In North America, a knockwurst refers to a short, plump sausage originating from northern Germany. It contains ground veal, ground pork, and fresh garlic stuffed into hog casings.

As part of the production process, the sausages are aged for two to five days, then smoked over oak wood. Knockwurst is often prepared highly seasoned.

Knockwurst is sometimes cut in half lengthwise before serving, for example when served on a sailor sandwich.

Knackwurst in Germany

Numerous regional varieties of knackwurst exist in Germany. They all differ from knackwurst varieties sold in Austria. There, a knackwurst always refers to a sausage containing bacon and added potato starch. In addition to the term "knackwurst", common names are "Salzburger" or "Schübling".

As a specialty in Hamburg, scalded Knackwurst served with mustard and half a slice of white bread is a popular snack for lunch. It is also sold at the Hamburger Dom, the largest Volksfest in northern Germany, under various, sometimes poetic, names like Domknacker, Hamburger Knacker, or Hafenlümmel (literally: harbour tyke).

Knake in Sweden
A knake refers to a short, plump and dark sausage which is produced by Holmgrens in the City of Lund, Lund. It is a Lund speciality and dates back to the 1910s. Today's recipe is dated to the 1960s.

See also

 List of sausages
 List of smoked foods

References 

German sausages
Smoked meat
Hamburg cuisine